Warfel is a surname. Notable people with the surname include:

Betty Warfel (1928–1990), American baseball player
Henry C. Warfel (1844–1923), American Civil War veteran
Michael William Warfel (born 1948), American Roman Catholic bishop